Arrah Assembly constituency is one of 243 assembly seats of the Bihar Legislative Assembly. It is part of Arrah Lok Sabha constituency along with 6 other assembly constituencies named Sandesh, Barhara, Tarari, Jagdishpur, Shahpur and Agiaon (SC). Since 2015, Arrah has been one of the 36 seats to have VVPAT enabled electronic voting machines.

Area/ Wards
Arrah Assembly constituency comprises:

 Gram Panchayats: Ganghar, Ramapur Sandia, Piraunta, Sandia, Makhdumpur Dumra, Daulatpur, Bhakura, Jamira, Hasanpura, Gothahula, Karari, Mahuli & Arrah (M) of Arrah CD Block.

Members of the Legislative Assembly
From 1952 to 1967, Arrah had two assembly seats: Arrah and Arrah Muffasil. Later in 1967, Arrah Muffasil was merged into the Arrah constituency. 

Ambika Sharan Singh of the Indian National Congress (INC) had won the Arrah Muffasil Assembly constituency in 1952, 1957 and 1962 Bihar Legislative Assembly elections.    

The list of the Members of the Legislative Assembly (MLA) representing Arrah constituency is as follows:

Elections

See also
 List of Assembly constituencies of Bihar

Sources
Bihar Assembly Election Results in 1951
Bihar Assembly Election Results in 1957
Bihar Assembly Election Results in 1962
Bihar Assembly Election Results in 1967
Bihar Assembly Election Results in 1969
Bihar Assembly Election Results in 1972
Bihar Assembly Election Results in 1977
Bihar Assembly Election Results in 1980
Bihar Assembly Election Results in 1985
Bihar Assembly Election Results in 1990
Bihar Assembly Election Results in 1995
Bihar Assembly Election Results in 2000
Bihar Assembly Election Results in 2005
Bihar Assembly Election Results in 2010

References

External links
 

Arrah
Assembly constituencies of Bihar
Politics of Bhojpur district, India